The Lukaya is a river in the Democratic Republic of the Congo. Its source is located in the Crystal Mountains (Montagnes de Cristal), from which it runs eastward through Bas-Congo, then runs into the banks of the Ndjili River. The rail line from Matadi to Kinshasa runs along the river valley for a time, passing to the south and then to the east of Kinshasa. At one point the river was the namesake of a district in the Congo Free State.

Just to the south of Kinshasa, a small cascade on the river, the Petites Chutes de la Lukaya, is a gathering place for several tourist activities including the lake formed by the river valley, beaches and waterfalls, and the Lola Ya Bonobo Sanctuary of Kinshasa. This is located in the Mont Ngafula neighborhood, which the river runs through.

References

Rivers of the Democratic Republic of the Congo